Qalakənd (also, Kalakend) is a village in the Gadabay Rayon of Azerbaijan.  The village forms part of the municipality of Plankənd. The name "Qalakənd" means "castle town", referring to the ruins of the medieval fortress of Parisos located near the village on a bluff overlooking the Shamkir river.

References 

Populated places in Gadabay District